Iveagh Lower, Upper Half is the name of a barony in County Down, Northern Ireland. It was created by 1851 with the division of the barony of Iveagh Lower into two. It is bordered by five other baronies: Iveagh Upper, Lower Half to the south; Iveagh Upper, Upper Half to the south-west; Iveagh Lower, Lower Half to the west and north; Castlereagh Upper to the north-east; and Kinelarty to the west.

List of settlements
Below is a list of the villages and population centres in Iveagh Lower, Upper Half:

Large villages
Hillsborough
Moira
Waringstown

Villages
Blackskull
Donaghcloney
Gilford
Lawrencetown
Magheralin
Ravernet

Hamlets and population centres
Lenaderg
Maze
Waringsford

List of civil parishes
Below is a list of civil parishes in Iveagh Lower, Upper Half:
Blaris (also partly in baronies of Castlereagh Upper and Massereene Upper)
Donaghcloney
Donaghmore (two townlands, rest in barony of Iveagh Upper, Upper Half)
Dromore (one townland, rest in barony of Iveagh Lower, Lower Half)
Hillsborough 
Magheralin (also partly in barony of Oneilland East (three townlands))
Magherally (one townland, rest in barony of Iveagh Lower, Lower Half)
Moira (also partly in barony of Iveagh Upper, Upper Half (one townland))
Seapatrick (also partly in baronies of Iveagh Lower, Lower Half and Iveagh Upper, Upper Half)
Shankill (one townland, rest in barony of Oneilland East)
Tullylish (also partly in barony of Iveagh Lower, Lower Half (one townland))

References